is a retired Japanese chess player and widow of former world chess champion Bobby Fischer.

Biography
She was awarded the title of Woman International Master by FIDE in 1997. Watai is a four-time Japanese women's champion. She lives in Kamata ward, which is now part of Ōta, Tokyo.

In 1973, she met then world chess champion Bobby Fischer, and visited him several times for the next three decades. Starting in 2000 they reportedly lived together in a de facto marriage at her home. After Bobby Fischer's detention on July 13, 2004 for trying to travel with a revoked U.S. passport, she campaigned for his release. 

They were reportedly married in August 2004. According to an attorney representing a competing claim to Fischer's estate, the Supreme Court of Iceland ruled in December 2009 that Watai's claim of marriage to Fischer was invalidated because of her failure to present the original of their alleged marriage certificate. However, on March 3, 2011, a district court in Iceland ruled that Miyoko Watai, as Fischer's widow and heir, was entitled to inherit his estate. It also ruled that Watai and Fischer had legally married on September 6, 2004.

References

External links 

Miyoko Watai chess games at 365Chess.com

1945 births
Living people
Chess Woman International Masters
Japanese chess players
Japanese pharmacists
Sportspeople from Tokyo